Other uses: the town of Bacanora, Sonora.

Bacanora is an agave-derived liquor made in the Mexican state of Sonora.

The distillation of Bacanora was illegal until 1992, being bootlegged by vinateros for many generations. Since 2000 Bacanora has been issued with an origin denomination bill by the Mexican government. This means that only mescal produced by the agave variety grown in the Sonora municipalities of Bacanora, Sahuaripa, Arivechi, Soyopa, San Javier, Cumpas, Moctezuma, San Pedro de la Cueva, Tepache, Divisaderos, Granados, Huásabas, Villa Hidalgo, Bacadéhuachi, Nácori Chico, Huachinera, Villa Pesqueira, Aconchi, San Felipe de Jesús, Huépac, Banámichi, Rayón, Baviácora, Opodepe, Arizpe, Rosario de Tesopaco, Quiriego, Suaqui Grande, Onavas, Yécora, Álamos, San Miguel de Horcasitas, Ures, and La Colorada can legally be called Bacanora.

 Federal Commerce Department Delegate, Sonora Mexico & Leading Bacanora Expert

See also
Aguardiente
Pulque
Tequila
Mexican wine
Mexican beer
Mexican cuisine

References

Liqueurs
Agave
Mexican distilled drinks
Sonora